Samuel Morse (1791–1872) was an American painter and inventor. 

Samuel Morse may also refer to:
Salmi Morse (1826–1884), German-American theater manager
Samuel Finley Brown Morse (1885–1969), American environmental conservationist
Samuel French Morse (1916–1985), American poet and teacher
Samuel Finley Breese Morse (sculpture), sculpture depicting American painter and inventor Samuel Morse in New York City
Samuel Morse (Dedham) (1585-1654), an early settler of Dedham, Massachusetts